John Rawlins (by 1493 – 10 October 1532) was an English politician.

He was a Member (MP) of the Parliament of England for Gloucester in 1529. He was Mayor of Gloucester in 1524–25.

References

15th-century births
1532 deaths
English MPs 1529–1536
Members of the Parliament of England (pre-1707) for Gloucester